Martin O'Neill (born 1952) is a retired footballer and current football manager.

Martin O'Neill may also refer to:
Martin O'Neill, Baron O'Neill of Clackmannan (1945–2020), Scottish politician
Martin O'Neill (footballer, born 1975), a former Scottish footballer
Martin O'Neill (hurler) in 2012 All-Ireland Senior Hurling Championship